Xu Zhijie may refer to:

Hsu Chi-chieh (born 1988), Taiwanese swimmer
Hsu Chih-chieh (born 1966), Taiwanese politician